The Nicoll Highway collapse was a construction accident that occurred at approximately 3:30 p.m. Singapore Time (UTC+8:00) on 20 April 2004 in Kallang, Singapore when a tunnel being constructed for use by MRT trains collapsed. The tunnel was part of the construction of the underground Circle Line, near Nicoll Highway station. The collapse killed four people and injured three. The accident delayed the construction end date for the MRT station.

Causes
Investigations and probes into the collapse commenced immediately. It eventually was found that the most apparent cause of the collapse was that the retaining wall could not handle the stress of holding up the tunnel, forcing it to give way. This occurred near the Nicoll Highway MRT station under construction along the Circle Line and near the Merdeka Bridge.

Consequences of the collapse
The accident left a collapse zone 150 m wide, 100 m long, and 30 m deep. Four workers were killed, with three more injured. Steel beams were twisted, with two construction cranes being swallowed up. A substantial chunk of the main highway running over the tunnel was also knocked out.

The rescue efforts were called off on 23rd of that month because of the low chance of survival by that point, as well as danger to the rescue teams. There was also the increasing need to stabilize the ground around the accident site to reduce the risk of further collapses. All six lanes of the Nicoll Highway were heavily damaged, rendering the road unusable. The highway re-opened on 4 December that year after reconstruction efforts.

A committee of inquiry found the main contractor Nishimatsu Construction Company (:ja:西松建設) and its officers as well as Land Transport Authority officers responsible for the collapse. Several other officers and subcontractors were reprimanded and issued warnings in connection with the accident. As a result of the accident, Stages 1 and 2 of the Circle Line were delayed. Stage 3 of the line, Bartley to Marymount stations opened first on 28 May 2009. Eventually, Nicoll Highway station started operations on 17 April 2010.

Victims
 Vadivil a/l Nadesan, crane operator
A Malaysian of Indian descent, his body was the first to be recovered. The 44-year-old had reportedly tried to escape by jumping out from his crane when the incident occurred. He was found caught between a pick-up truck and a container.
 Liu Rong Quan, construction worker
The body of the 36-year-old Chinese national from Jiangsu province was found wedged between the wheel and chassis of a  truck. Liu had started working at the site ten days before the incident. He left behind a wife and daughter.
 John Tan Lock Yong, Land Transport Authority engineer
The third victim to be found, Tan was due to finish his contract with LTA at the end of 2004 and had planned to migrate to Australia or New Zealand. He left behind his wife, a grown-up daughter and a son.
 Heng Yeow Pheow, foreman
The body of the 40-year-old Singaporean was never recovered. According to survivor accounts, Heng had selflessly hurried his workers to safety, saving 8 other workers, but himself was trapped when the collapse occurred. Heng left behind his wife, two young children, his 70-year-old mother and nine siblings.

Additionally, Heng's family received S$380,000 in settlements from the three construction firms involved with the collapse, and S$630,000 in public donations. The money from the public donations was diverted into a trust fund, set up by Heng's Member of Parliament, Irene Ng, which expenses for his children's upkeep could be drawn from until 2019.

Criminal trials

Four men faced criminal charges in the wake of the incident.

The first man put on trial was Ng Seng Yoong who was a project director of the Circle MRT line and also monitored the excavation and design work in his other capacity as the "Qualified Person" on the site. He faced one charge of breaching conditions under the Building Control Act. Arguments were made that readings of instruments on site have indicated that things were not going as planned, but the warnings were not acted upon. On 24 November 2005, Ng was fined S$8,000 by the court.

Aftermath 
Heng was posthumously awarded the Pingat Keberanian (Medal of Valour) for helping his colleagues to safety first instead of escaping. Nine SCDF officers from the Disaster Assistance and Rescue Team who were involved in the search and rescue efforts were also awarded the Pingat Keberanian. SCDF Commissioner, James Tan, who was in charge of the rescue team, was awarded the Pingat Pentadbiran Awam - Emas (Public Administration Medal - Gold) and 18 other SCDF officers awarded other State medals.

As a result of the collapse, the construction site for Nicoll Highway MRT had to be shifted to a site further south.

References

External links
 IAP class probes Singapore highway collapse — MIT report
 Nicoll Highway collapse — Singapore Civil Defence Force
 Nicoll Highway Collapse – Singapore Infopedia

2004 disasters in Singapore
2004 in Singapore
Engineering failures
Accidents and incidents involving Mass Rapid Transit (Singapore)
Railway accidents in 2004
Construction accidents
April 2004 events in Asia
Kallang
Rail accidents and incidents in Singapore
Man-made disasters in Singapore